Miss Botswana is a national beauty pageant in Botswana.

History 
Botswana pageantry runs parallel with the history of the country. Even though there had been beauty contests conducted in various villages around the country in the early 1960s, the first Miss Botswana beauty contest was in 1967, conducted as part of Botswana independence celebrations.

At the time, it was determined that the colourful first beauty event was going to 'pick a perfect representative of the nation's modern womanhood. Theresa Rantao satisfactorily met those requirements. She became the winner of the Miss Botswana 1967. Earlier in 1964, Veronica Magosi of Lobatse won the Miss Bechuanaland crown. In 1965 the crown was won by Lydia Tiyo.

Botswana made its debut at Miss World in 1972. Traditionally, the winner of Miss Botswana represents the country at Miss World. Botswana Council of Women is currently in charge for the organization of the contest.

Titleholders

Botswana at International pageants

Miss World Botswana
 
Miss Botswana has started to send a Winner to Miss World. On occasion, when the winner does not qualify (due to age) for either contest, a runner-up is sent.

See also
Miss Universe Botswana
Miss Earth Botswana
Botswana at major beauty pageants

References

External links

Official facebook
Official facebook for Miss World 

Botswana
Botswana
Recurring events established in 1964
1972 establishments in Botswana
Botswana awards